Malecón 2000 is the name given to boardwalk overlooking the Guayas River in the Ecuadorian port city of Guayaquil. An urban renewal project focusing on the old Simón Bolívar boardwalk,  it  stands along the west shore of the river for an approximate length of 2.5 km. (1.5 mi.) Several of the greatest historical monuments in the history of Guayaquil can be seen along its length, as well as museums, gardens, fountains, shopping malls, restaurants, bars, food courts, the first IMAX theater in South America, as well as boarding docks where several embarkations offer both daytime and nighttime tours up and down the Guayas River.
It is one of the largest works realized in Guayaquil and it is considered a model of urban regeneration by global standards, having been declared a healthy public space by the Pan-American Organization of Health (POH) and the World Health Organization (WHO).

History

During the colonial period, Malecón was a narrow path in roadway form. During the 19th century people started to gather around this place, gradually expanding its extension as years went by and it became a focal point of early social life in the young city.

Over several decades, the boardwalk fell into disrepair with several areas of it eventually falling into the river itself by the mid-to-late 1980s. By this time it was also regarded as a very unsafe place, as many thieves, muggers and cutpurses took advantage of the cover provided by overgrown foliage and poor illumination to hide and wait for possible victims. Drug dealers and prostitutes also used to frequent the area at night during its most dangerous period.

Present
Initiated during the administration of Mayor León Febres-Cordero, ex-president of the Republic of Ecuador, and finalized during the second term of his successor, Jaime Nebot Saadi, it held as one of its goals the re-valuation of the commercial areas of the city creating spaces that would encourage urban renewal, a goal that has been successful thanks to the leadership and commitment of the private sector. The Malecón now receives both national and foreign visitors who marvel at and enjoy its beauty and safety. At 5 million visitors since its first stage inauguration in October 1999, it is one of the most visited places in the city.

It offers visitors a wide range of activities, varying from just plain fun, to cultural events as well as an opportunity to explore the natural resources Guayaquil has.
It has a mall, a museum, infinity of restaurants, exhibition galleries, lagoons, and walk paths.

The Malecón 2000 Foundation, a private non-profit entity, administers the boardwalk. This foundation is comprised by the most representative public and private entities in the city.

Locations

Sections
Malecón 2000 is divided into several sections:
 The north section has several plazas, water fountains, an antique Ecuadorian train, spaces for aerobics and games for children, also a Planetarium, an anthropological Museum, a Contemporary Art Museum, and an IMAX
 The central area is home the historic Civic Plaza with its sculptures: the Moorish Clock Tower and Rotonda Monument. The Guayaquil Yacht Club and the Naval Yacht club are located here too.
 In the south part is located the modern Bahía Malecón Shopping Center where you can buy clothes, eat, and even buy souvenirs.

Monuments

As you walk you can also appreciate the monuments, some of them created in honor of important characters in the history of our country:

The José Joaquín de Olmedo bust, poet and first mayor of Guayaquil.
Moorish Tower or Public Clock, the clock was bought in England by Don Manuel Antonio Lizárraga, a rich Spanish merchant, an illustrious figure of the Independence, it was inaugurated in October 1842.
La Rotonda, right on 9 de Octubre Avenue, a monument to the encounter between the liberators José de San Martín from Argentina and Simón Bolívar from Venezuela in 1822. They fought against the Spanish people for our freedom from their oppression.
The Carlos Alberto Arroyo del Río monument, commemorating the Ecuadorian president who was born in Guayaquil.

Recreational Areas
Wagon Square: In this square we can find an Ecuadorian railroad adapted as space for exhibitions to which people can access through a waiting platform with a pergola. The square is supplemented with resting and shading areas, there is also a sculpture that integrates itself and is part of the wagon environment and which has relationship with the railroads.
Children Playground: This area begins with a ramp that leads to a watchtower with a toboggan. It contains games for children of all ages; areas like pergolas with seats and shade are available for the visitors.
Fountain Square: Located at the Junín street axis, serves as future vehicular entrance to the parking spaces of the commercial areas that will be developed over the river.
Restaurants: There you have a variety of restaurants with different types of food from Ecuador and also from some places in the world.
Exercise Area: It's a green area equipped for aerobics and outdoors exercises, where people gather to stay in shape.
Orellana Square: Located in front of Orellana street gate, this is the northern end of this sector and it serves as connection with the Malecón Gardens
Mercado Sur: looks like a glass estate where several events take place for the city's celebrations, and it is located next to Club De La Union
Malecón Shopping Center: Is located from Villamil to Sucre streets. It has more than 230 stores in its four galleries, among boutiques, perfumery, jeweler's, footwear stores, memories and appliances.

Gardens
The Malecón Gardens, are parks of approximately 22,000 m2. of extension, where visitors can enjoy different botanic species of Ecuador.
It also has an artificial stream on Orellana street and a pond that spreads between Tomás Martinez and Loja streets. It has a pedestrian path ensemble, and this circuit has been adapted to the presence of the big existent trees, this zone is enhanced by extensive and profuse green areas.
The walk in the Gardens, includes beautiful landscapes and rest areas supported by public spaces such as squares, small squares, miradors, gazebos, bleachers, jetties, pergolas. These spaces are supplemented with streams, lagoon, island, fountains, bridges, ramps and paths where activities related to the park such as scheduled exhibitions and sales of plants and souvenirs from The Malecón Gardens are developed.

Museo Antropológico
Another great place that every visitor and tourist should not miss is this great Museum of Anthropology (Museo Antropológico). It offers great expositions of local artists as well as international ones, the whole place gives an atmosphere of modern architecture and technology. Every week the works and events are updated to be presented to the public.  Prices can vary from 50 cents to $1.50, depending on the event or what is being exposed.

References and external links

Official Guayaquil Website

Buildings and structures in Guayaquil
Tourist attractions in Guayaquil